Jammu and Kashmir is home to several valleys such as the Kashmir Valley, Chenab Valley, Sindh Valley and Lidder Valley. Some major tourist attractions in Jammu and Kashmir are Srinagar, with its renowned Dal Lake and Mughal Gardens, Gulmarg, Pahalgam, Bhaderwah, Patnitop and Jammu. Every year, thousands of Hindu pilgrims visit holy shrines of Vaishno Devi and Amarnath which has had a significant impact on the state's economy.

Kashmir Valley is one of the top tourist destinations of India. Gulmarg, one of the most popular ski resort destinations in India, is also home to the world's highest green golf course. Tourism has declined in the past thirty years.

Jammu and Kashmir also has flower gardens and apple orchards. It attracts tourists for its handicrafts and the Kashmiri shawls.

Major attractions in North Kashmir 
The first ever Map of Tourism in Jammu and Kashmir was published in "Konnect Magazine" and then on official Twitter handle of Jammu and Kashmir Tourism. North Kashmir is located mostly in the Himalayan mountains.

Bangus Valley 
Between the green hills, streams, and meadows lie a valley In Jammu and Kashmir's Kupwara where the cattle run wild, birds sing lullabies through the day. The place is named Bangus Valley. According to a report, the valley is located nearly 10,000 meters above sea level (MSL). The Bangus Valley is located in Kupwara district of North Kashmir. It is situated to the West of Handwara town along the Mawri River within the Handwara sub-district. district Kupwara.  The term Bangus comes from Sanskrit word Van (Forest) and gus (grass).The valley is nearly 130 km from Srinagar and is situated on the northwestern border of Tehsil Handwara in Kupwara. Divided into two parts-Bod Bungus (Big Bungus) and Lokut Bungus (Small Bungus) the valley spans over an area of 300 sq km. Bangus is about 150 kilometres (93 mi) from Srinagar at an altitude of 10,000 feet (3,000 m). The principal valley is locally known as "Boud Bangus" (Big Bangus) and has an estimated area of about 300 square kilometers. It consists of a linear elliptical bowl aligned along the east–west axis and is surrounded by Rajwar and Mawar in the east, Shamasbury and Dajlungun Mountains in the west and Chowkibal and Karnah Guli in the north. It is surrounded by the Shamsbery mountain range and the Leepa Valley, according to the report. After years of planning, Bangus was recently made motorable via the Mawer route while work is in full swing on the Chowkibal and Rajwar routes. Its high altitude and unpredictable weather conditions were a huge obstacle but the administration has materialized this project in a short span of time. The Centre recognised 75 new destinations in the Union Territory for tourism this year. Under the Jal Jeevan Mission and 'Har Ghar Nal Say Jal Mission, the water scarcity days of Kupwara are over. The district constructed 400 Amrit Sarovar in 2022 to support the safe drinking water initiative of the government. The Kupwara District Administration and Tourism Department organized a two day Bangus Mela earlier this year in August. The event focused on the traditions and culture of the region. Music artists, singers, Kashmiri Rowfdancers, and school report said. children organized shows for the audience. Pony wallas also put up a special segment with the ponies displaying riding tricks and offering salami to the spectators. The festival folk songs were played nonstop which added to the upbeat atmosphere of the usually quiet valley.

The Lolab Bangus Drang yari Development Authority (LRDDA) installed night-stay tents for tourists. The meadows and slopes of Bungus are enveloped in flowers and medicinal plants such as Macrotima Benthami (gew zaban), Saussurea Sacra (Jugi pedshah), and Aconitum Heterophylleum (patrees). Recently a new species of flowering medicinal plant ‘Swertia Kashmirensis’ has been discovered in Bungus. The fauna in Bungus includes musk deer, antelope, snow leopards, brown and black bears, monkeys, and red foxes. The bird species include pheasants, tragopan, black partridge, bush quail, and wildfowl. Until two years ago, the valley was not an easy destination due to its proximity to the LoC (5 km) but the reinstallation of better security systems after the abrogation of Article 370, has helped to increase the faith of explorers who earlier did not find it safe to visit. Previously, visitors had to obtain permits from the District Magistrate to trek and camp but with the ripple effect of the political developments has been so effective that all such restrictions have now been lifted.

As of 2 June 2022, the road connectivity from Handwara side via Mawer is complete. People can take only small cars to Bangus because work on macdamisation is still going on. Vehicles are available on rent basis from Handwara market. Night stay tents are also available there. There are three routes to visit this place. The least distance route from Handwara via Reshwari Mawer. The second route is also from Handwara but via Rajwar and is suitable for trekking only. The third route from Kupwara via Chowkibal.

Bhadrakali Mandir 
An ancient idol of Mata Bhadrakali was reinstalled at a temple in Jammu and Kashmir's Kupwara district years after it was brought back from Jammu. The ancient temple at Bhadrakali Village in Handwara wore a festive look as the original idol of the presiding deity, Maa Bhadrakali, was restored to its original abode in a simple ceremony in March 2019. The idol was stolen in 1981 was subsequently recovered and kept in Jammu since 1999. It is believed that during the exodus of Pandits from Handwara, the idol was left behind in the house of Pandit Jaggernath. The nearest airport is Sheikh ul-Alam International Airport in Srinagar located 78.8 kilometres from Handwara. Handwara is not yet connected to railways. The nearest railway station is Baramulla railway station located 30 kilometres from Handwara.Handwara is well-connected with roads and highways. The NH 701 passes through Handwara alongside other intra-town roads.

Tithwal 
Tithwal is a small border village about 171 kms from Srinagar. After a scenic drive through Sopore, Kupwara and on to Tangdhar, one arrives at Tithwal. Another 80kms and on comes Sharda Peeth. Beyond the Sadhna top lies the Karnah valley along the river Kishan-Ganga and at the edge of it is the last village of North-West Kashmir, Tithwal. At 10600 feet, Sadhna pass nested on the mighty Shamshabari mountain ranges originally known as Nastachun Pass is the only access to the Karnah, Neelam and Leepa valley. In the olden days, Tithwal was the trading hub where hundreds of shops lined up selling ghee, honey and walnut kernels. Those commodities would reach Tithwal from Karnah, Leepa and Neelam valleys. To immerse fully into the surroundings, the Forest Department of J&K, like at many other places, have built Kail and Deodar huts. To reach Tithwal one has to take NH1 from Airport road. After travelling for 45 Kms on NH1 take a right turn to Sangrama - Sopore road and then turn left onto Sopore - Kupwara road and then follow NH 701 to reach Tithwal.

Ancient Stupa Parihaspora 
Paraspore or Paraspur is a small town 22kms North-West of Srinagar in the Kashmir Valley. It was built on a plateau above the Jhelum River by Lalitaditya Muktapida. Parihaspur lost its status as a capital after Lalitaditya's death. His son moved the royal residence. The Jhelum River is to the northeast of Parihaspur as it meets the Sind Nallah at Shadpur sangam. In the past this confluence of the rivers occurred closer to Parihaspur. To reach Paraspore one has to head southwest on Airport Road, make a U-turn to hit NH1. Continue straight on NH1 past M.R. Brand for 55kms and turn left onto Baramula-Gulmarg road and stay on it for 1.2kms to reach the destination.

Detha Mandir 
The lord Detha temple is situated in a small village about 105 Kms from Srinagar.  To reach this temple, one must take a long drive moving from Srinagar to Pattan and onwards to Uri. The century-old map is the key to understanding the wealth of Hindu heritage and culture that Kashmir was once renowned for. One of the most noted monuments documented by many archaeologists, historians and architects is the Datta Mandir located at Banihal near Uri. To reach Detha Mandir one has to head Southwest on Airport Road, make a U-turn to hit NH1and drive for 3.8 Kms followed by a slight left onto NH1. After a drive of 15 Kms on NH1 past M.R. Brand, turn left after 1.2 Kms on to NH1. Stay on this road for 89 Kms until you reach Datta Temple, Uri.

Gurudwara Thara Sahib, Baramulla 
Baramulla is a boulevard surrounded by breathtaking rice fields and meadows. Baramulla is about 55 km from Srinagar. This historic shrine is 8 Kms away from Baramulla town and 01 Kms on Baramulla – Srinagar National highway. According to local history, a faqir named Balol and his disciples met Guru Sahib near Kalampura village. They discussed religious discourses with Guru Ji. At the request of people, Guru Ji dug out a fresh water chisma. In the last years of 19th century, a plate form (Thara) 20 x 25 ft. was constructed by S. Matwal Singh Sahni and other Gur Sikhs. Chief Khalsa Dewan Amritsar intellectuals like Bhai Vir Singh, S. Damodar Singh Engineer, S. Narinder Singh and others also visited this place and constructed a Gurdwara in 1928-1931 A.D. The Gurdwara is managed by Gurdwara Parbandhak Committee, Baramulla.  To reach Gurudwara Thara Sahib one has to Head Southwest on Airport Road, make a U-turn to hit NH1and drive for 3.8kms followed by a slight left onto NH1. After a drive of 15kms on NH1 past M.R. Brand, turn left after 1.2kms on to NH1. Continue straight for 32kms passing Zehra Crossing and then turn left onto Singhpora-Delina Road. After driving for 2.9kms, turn right onto Singhpora-Kalampora Road for 260mtrs arriving at the destination

Major attractions in South Kashmir

Gulmarg

Jammu

Pahalgam

Sonmarg

Srinagar

Verinag

Gurez

Doodhpathri

Kheer Bhawani

Major tourist attractions in Chenab Valley

The Chenab valley is a region which refers to districts of Doda, Kishtwar, Ramban and parts of Reasi. The major tourist attractions in this region are;
Bhaderwah.
Jai Valley.
Padri Pass.
Lal Draman
Bhal Padri
Sinthan Top
Chenab Rail Bridge

Adventure tourism

Skiing
 Gulmarg
 Patnitop
 Sanasar
 Jai Valley: The Jai Valley at a height of 7000 ft. located 32 km from Bhaderwah, and 232 km (approx.) from Jammu is a region spread over 6 km receives ample snow to attract ski-lovers and snow-boarders.

Rafting
 Sonamarg- river rafting tournaments are held by tourism department.
  The Reasi- Dera Baba Banda Bahadur stretch of 12 km (approx.) houses rapids up to 3rd grade and is ideal for amateurs and joy rides.

Para-gliding
 Sanasar, 19 km west of Patnitop and 130 km from Jammu.

Camping
 Sanasar
 Bani-Sarthal
 Jai Valley
 Patnitop

Rock climbing
 Patnitop
 Sanasar
 Bhaderwah

Trekking
 Udhampur
 Patnitop
 Kishtwar
 Bhaderwah
 Bani-Basholi
 Sarthal valley
Sonamarg

Transport 

The primary methods of transport in Jammu and Kashmir are by road and air. It has access to the rest of India through the Banihal road tunnel near Qazigund on national highway NH 1A
Now known as NH 44
and through NH 1B that passes through Sinthan pass and Kishtwar.

Jammu and Kashmir has 2 civil airports. The Jammu Airport and the Sheikh ul-Alam International Airport in Srinagar. They receive direct flights from New Delhi, Mumbai and Bengaluru.

Banihal railway station will be linked to the rest of India in another few years as the construction of the railway line from Jammu to Banihal progresses steadily.

See also
List of tourist attractions in Chenab Valley.
Kashmir Conflict

References

External links

 Official website of the Jammu and Kashmir tourism
 Official website of J&K Tourism Development Corporation
 Official website of J&K State Road Transport Corporation
 jammu-kashmir-tourism 

 01
Economy of Jammu and Kashmir